The following is a list of artists from South Africa.

A 
 Bill Ainslie (1934–1989)
 Jane Alexander (born 1959)
 Siemon Allen (born 1971)
 Nils Andersen (1897–1972)
 Tyrone Appollis (born 1957)
 Dieter Aschenborn (1915–2002)
 Hans Aschenborn (1888–1931)
 Uli Aschenborn (born 1947)
 Leigh Ashton (born 1956)

B 
 Beezy Bailey (born 1962)
 Kenneth Baker (1921–1996)
 Walter Battiss (1906–1982)
 Janko de Beer (born 1980)
 Charles Davidson Bell (1813–1882), Scottish-born painter, artist and stamp designer
 Deborah Bell (born 1957), sculptor, painter and mixed media artist
 Willie Bester (born 1956)
 Harry Bolus (1834–1911), botanist, botanical artist, businessman and philanthropist
 D. C. Boonzaier (1865–1950)
 Gregoire Boonzaier (1909–2005)
 Dineo Seshee Bopape (born 1981)
 Steven Bosch (born 1978)
 Cristina Boshoff (born 1980), singer
 Willem Boshoff (born 1951)
 Wim Botha (born 1974)
 Candice Breitz (born 1972)
 Lisa Brice (born 1968)
 Lesley-Ann Brandt (born 1981)
 Rhona Brown (1922–2014), botanical artist
 Winifred Brunton (1880–1959), painter, especially of Egyptian pharaohs

C 
 Sarah Calburn (born 1964)
 Norman Catherine (born 1949)
 Bettie Cilliers-Barnard (1914–2010)
 Frans Claerhout (1919–2006)
 Julia Rosa Clark (born 1975)
 Peter Clarke (1929–2014)
 Christo Coetzee (1929–2000)
 Ernest Cole (1940–1990)
 Ruann Coleman (born 1988)
 Gillian Condy (born 1952), botanical artist
 Ben Jay Crossman (born 1979)
 Tom Cullberg (born 1972)

D 
 Nerine Desmond (1908–1993)
 Mbali Dhlamini (born 1990), photographer
 Adriaan Diedericks (born 1990), sculptor
 Ethel May Dixie (1876–1973), botanical artist
 Marlene Dumas (born 1953)

E 
 Peter Eastman (born 1976)
 Paul Emsley (born 1947), portrait painter and lecturer
 Garth Erasmus (born 1956)

F 
 Dumile Feni (1939–1991), sculptor and printmaker
 Cyril Fradan (1928–1997), artist and designer, especially of acrylic paints incorporating various glazing techniques
 Abrie Fourie (born 1969), artist specialising in photography and digital media

G 
 Kendell Geers (born 1968)
 Allerley Glossop (1870–1955)
 David Goldblatt (1930–2018)
 Arthur Goldreich (1929–1982)
 Frances Goodman (born 1975)

H 
 Caesar Carl Hans Henkel (1839–1913), German-born South African forester, cartographer, painter, soldier and botanist
 Matthew Hindley (born 1974)
 Nicholas Hlobo (born 1975), sculptor
 Robert Hodgins (1920–2010), English-born South African painter and printmaker
 Rosa Hope (1902–1972), English-born South African painter
 Pieter Hugo (born 1976), photographer

J 
 Gavin Jantjes (born 1948), painter
 Barbara Jeppe (1921–1999), botanical artist
 Gabriel de Jongh (1913–2004)
 Tinus de Jongh (1885–1942), painter

K 
 Anton Kannemeyer (born 1967)
 William Kentridge (born 1955)
 Wolf Kibel (1903–1938)
 David Koloane (1938–2019)
 Ansel Krut (born 1959), painter based in London, UK
 David Kuijers (born 1962), painter, designer and illustrator

L 
 Maggie Laubser (1886–1973)
 Ralph Lazar (born 1967)
 Cythna Letty (1895–1985), botanical artist
 Carla Liesching (born 1985)
 Kai Lossgott (born 1980)

M 
 Noria Mabasa (born 1938)
 Fikile Magadlela (1952–2003)
 Esther Mahlangu (born 1935)
 Billy Mandindi (1967–2005)
 Anja Marais (born 1974)
Amitabh Mitra (born 1955) painter, physician
 Louis Maqhubela (born 1939)
 Gerhard Marx (born 1976)
 Judith Mason (1938–2016), painter, sculptor and installation artist
 Kagiso Patrick Mautloa (born 1952)
 Johannes Petrus Meintjes (1923–1980), artist, author and historian
 John Meyer (born 1942), painter
 Ina Millman, artist and art teacher
 Anthony Morton (1923–2006)
 Nandipha Mntambo (born 1982)
 Santu Mofokeng (1956–2020)
 Zwelethu Mthethwa (born 1960), painter and photographer
 Zanele Muholi (born 1972)
 Brett Murray (born 1961)
 Credo Mutwa (1921–2020)

N 
 Hermann Niebuhr (born 1972), painter of primarily urban and rural landscapes
 Zelda Nolte (1929–2003), sculptor and woodblock printmaker
 Neo Ntsoma (born 1972)
 Thenjiwe Nkosi (born 1980)

O 
 Johan Oldert (1912–1984), painter and sculptor
 Ken Oosterbroek (1963–1994), photographer

P 
 Karabo Poppy (born 1992)
 Georgia Papageorge (born 1941)
 Charles Ernest Peers (1875–1944)
 George Pemba (1912–2001)
 Peet Pienaar (born 1971)
 Jacobus Hendrik Pierneef (1886–1957)
 Barbara Pike (born 1933), botanical artist
 Stanley Pinker (1924–2012)
 Deborah Poynton (born 1970)
 Alexis Preller (1911–1975)

R 
 Gavin Rain (born 1971)
 Jo Ratcliffe 
 Richard Rennie (1839–1905)
 Robin Rhode (born 1976)
 Dolf Rieser (1898–1983), South African-born British painter, printmaker, and teacher
 Tracey Rose (born 1974)
 David Rosen (1959–2014)
 Athi-Patra Ruga (born 1984)

S 
 Ruth Sacks (born 1977)
 Claudette Schreuders (born 1973)
 Peter Schutz (1930–2017)
 Richard Scott (born 1968)
 Berni Searle (born 1964)
 Gerard Sekoto (1913–1993)
 Mary Sibande (born 1982)
 Penny Siopis (born 1953)
 Lucas Sithole (1931–1994)
 Cecil Skotnes (1926–2009)
 Sean Slemon (born 1978)
 Kathryn Smith (born 1975)
 Frank Sydney Spears (1906–1991)
 Irma Stern (1894–1966)
 Paul Stopforth (born 1945)
 Jack Stone (born 1986)
 Richardt Strydom (born 1971)
 Mikhael Subotzky (born 1981)
 Lisa Swerling (born 1972)
 Helen Sebidi (born 1943)

T 
 Guy Tillim (born 1962), photographer
 Vladimir Tretchikoff (1913–2006)
 Lawrence Holme Twentyman (1783–1852), silversmith

U 
 Jeannette Unite (born 1964), Earth artist who paints and draws with minerals and mining detritus from the "Industrial Sublime"

V 
 Strijdom van der Merwe (born 1961), land artist
 Maurice van Essche (1906–1977), Belgian-born South African painter, oil, gouache, acrylic and water-color; inspired by time in Belgian Congo (1939), inter alia
 Anton van Wouw (1862–1945), Dutch-born South African sculptor
 Nontsikelelo (Lolo) Veleko (born 1977)
 Jan Vermeiren (born 1949), paintings mainly in oil on canvas, etchings and lithography
 Diane Victor (born 1964)
 Jan Ernst Abraham Volschenk (1853–1936), landscape painter

W 

 Jeremy Wafer (born 1953)
 Donovan Ward (born 1962)
 Ellaphie Ward-Hilhorst (1920–1994), botanical artist
 James Webb (born 1975)
 Jean Welz (1900–1975)
 Sue Williamson (born 1941)

References

Bibliography 
 Sue Williamson and Ashraf Jamal, Art in South Africa: the future present, Publisher David Philip  (Cape Town), 1996.
 Frank Herreman and Mark D'Amato, Liberated voices: contemporary art from South Africa, The Museum for African Art, 1999.
 Emma Bedford and Sophie Perryer, 10 Years 100 Artists: Art In A Democratic South Africa, Struik, 2004.
 Sue Williamson, South African Art Now, HarperCollins, 2009.
 Sue Williamson, Resistance Art in South Africa, Juta and Company Ltd, 2010.
 Berman, Esmé (2010). Art and Artists of South Africa. Cape Town: G3 Publishers. pp. 376–379. .
 Three Centuries of South African Art: Fine Art, Architecture, Applied Arts, Hans Fransen (author) AD. Donker (Publisher), 1982

South African
Artists